Humberto André Redes Filho (born 20 June 1945) is a Brazilian former footballer who competed in the 1964 Summer Olympics.

References

1945 births
Living people
Association football forwards
Brazilian footballers
Olympic footballers of Brazil
Footballers at the 1964 Summer Olympics
Botafogo de Futebol e Regatas players